Uloboridae is a family of non-venomous spiders, known as cribellate orb weavers or hackled orb weavers. Their lack of venom glands is a secondarily evolved trait. Instead, they wrap their prey thoroughly in silk, cover it in regurgitated digestive enzymes, and then ingest the liquified body.

Description 
They are medium to large spiders, with tree claws, which lack venomous glands. They build a spiral web using cribellate silk, which is quite fuzzy. They are usually dull in color, and are able to camouflage well into their surroundings. Usually having a humped opisthosoma, which is notoriously more humped than the carapace. Their rear eyes curving, in some species stronger than others.

Hunting 
The hunting method of these spiders is quite unique among all animals in the kingdom. These spiders do not use an adhesive on their orb webs, but rather the very fine cribellate fibers on each strand of silk tend to ensnare prey. Since newly hatched uloborids lack the cribellum needed to produce cribellate sticky silk, their webs have a fundamentally different structure with a large number of fine radii, but no sticky spiral. Some spiders only building a single line web, while others make more complex webs. They lack venomous glands, which is very rare among spiders. They first catch their prey, using their silk. They wrap their prey, and severely compress it, then they cover the prey with digestive fluid. Oddly enough, their mouthparts never touch the prey. The spider starts ingesting as soon as the prey has been covered. It is thought that robust hairs protect the spider from the digestive fluids. Though it is unknown how this behavior first evolved.

Social Behavior 
Some species are able of forming colonies like Philoponella republicana, which make large messy webs. Some colonies may range from a couple of individuals to a couple hundred. These colonies may be nymph dominated or adult dominated, though a small colony dominated by adults could be a sign of the colony's slow death. These colonies show signs of being female dominated, as one would expect, with males only being found in larger colonies. This could mean males search for larger colonies, or had died out in the smaller colonies.

Distribution
This family has an almost worldwide distribution. Only two species are known from Northern Europe: Uloborus walckenaerius and Hyptiotes paradoxus. Similarly occurring solely in northern North America (e.g. southern Ontario) is Uloborus glomosus. The oldest known fossil species is Talbragaraneus from the Late Jurassic (Tithonian) Talbragar Fossil Bed of Australia.

Genera

, the World Spider Catalog accepts the following genera:

Ariston O. Pickard-Cambridge, 1896 – Mexico, Panama
Astavakra Lehtinen, 1967 – Philippines
Conifaber Opell, 1982 – Paraguay, Argentina, Colombia
Daramulunia Lehtinen, 1967 – Samoa, Vanuatu, Fiji
Hyptiotes Walckenaer, 1837 – Asia, South Africa, North America, Europe
Lubinella Opell, 1984 – Papua New Guinea
Miagrammopes O. Pickard-Cambridge, 1870 – South America, Central America, Asia, Oceania, Africa, Caribbean, North America
Octonoba Opell, 1979 – Asia, United States
Orinomana Strand, 1934 – South America
Philoponella Mello-Leitão, 1917 – Asia, Africa, North America, South America, Australia, Central America
Polenecia Lehtinen, 1967 – Azerbaijan
Purumitra Lehtinen, 1967 – Australia, Philippines
Siratoba Opell, 1979 – United States, Mexico
Sybota Simon, 1892 – Chile, Argentina
Tangaroa Lehtinen, 1967 – Vanuatu
Uaitemuri Santos & Gonzaga, 2017 – Brazil
Uloborus Latreille, 1806 – Asia, Oceania, South America, Africa, North America, Costa Rica, Europe
Waitkera Opell, 1979 – New Zealand
Zosis Walckenaer, 1841 – South America, Seychelles, Asia, Oceania, Cuba

See also
 List of Uloboridae species

References

External links

 World Spider Catalog
 

 
Araneomorphae families
Taxa named by Tamerlan Thorell